In geometry, the order-8 octagonal tiling is a regular tiling of the hyperbolic plane. It has Schläfli symbol of {8,8} (eight octagons around each vertex) and is self-dual.

Symmetry 
This tiling represents a hyperbolic kaleidoscope of 8 mirrors meeting at a point and bounding regular octagon fundamental domains. This symmetry by orbifold notation is called *44444444 with 8 order-4 mirror intersections. In Coxeter notation can be represented as [8,8*], removing two of three mirrors (passing through the octagon center) in the [8,8] symmetry.

Related polyhedra and tiling 

This tiling is topologically related as a part of sequence of regular tilings with octagonal faces, starting with the octagonal tiling, with Schläfli symbol {8,n}, and Coxeter diagram , progressing to infinity.

See also

Square tiling
Tilings of regular polygons
List of uniform planar tilings
List of regular polytopes

References
 John H. Conway, Heidi Burgiel, Chaim Goodman-Strass, The Symmetries of Things 2008,  (Chapter 19, The Hyperbolic Archimedean Tessellations)

External links 

 Hyperbolic and Spherical Tiling Gallery
 KaleidoTile 3: Educational software to create spherical, planar and hyperbolic tilings
 Hyperbolic Planar Tessellations, Don Hatch

Hyperbolic tilings
Isogonal tilings
Isohedral tilings
Order-8 tilings
Regular tilings
Self-dual tilings
Octagonal tilings